Liski is the name of several inhabited localities in Russia.

Urban localities
Liski, Voronezh Oblast, a town in Liskinsky District of Voronezh Oblast

Rural localities
Liski, Bryansk Oblast, a village in Pavlovsky Selsoviet of Unechsky District of Bryansk Oblast
Liski, Kaliningrad Oblast, a settlement in Khrabrovsky Rural Okrug of Guryevsky District of Kaliningrad Oblast
Liski, Zaluzhenskoye Rural Settlement, Liskinsky District, Voronezh Oblast, a selo in Zaluzhenskoye Rural Settlement of Liskinsky District of Voronezh Oblast